Sir John Ingilby, 1st Baronet FRS (9 May 1758 – 13 May 1815) of Ripley Castle, Yorkshire was a British politician.

He was the illegitimate son of Sir John Ingilby, 4th Baronet by Mary Wright and educated at Emmanuel College, Cambridge.

He was created a Baronet in 1781 and appointed High Sheriff of Yorkshire for 1781–82. He was a Member (MP) of the Parliament of Great Britain for East Retford from 1790 until 1796. He was elected a Fellow of the Royal Society as Sir John Ingilby, Bart. of Ripley in Yorkshire and Princes Street, Hanover Square, London in 1793.

He married Elizabeth, the daughter and heiress of Sir Wharton Amcotts, 1st Baronet of Kettlethorpe, Lincolnshire. They had 11 children, of whom only one son survived, who succeeded him as Sir William Amcotts-Ingilby, 2nd Baronet.

References

1758 births
1815 deaths
People from the Borough of Harrogate
Alumni of Emmanuel College, Cambridge
Baronets in the Baronetage of Great Britain
British MPs 1790–1796
Fellows of the Royal Society
High Sheriffs of Yorkshire
Members of the Parliament of Great Britain for English constituencies
Ingilby family